Grant-Hadley Enterprises was the first of three names used by an American small press publishing house specializing in science fiction titles. The company was founded in 1945 by Donald M. Grant and Thomas G. Hadley and published one title as Grant-Hadley Enterprises.  Kenneth J. Krueger joined the company in 1946 and the name was changed to The Buffalo Book Company.  Later in 1946, Hadley continued the company on his own as The Hadley Publishing Co.

Grant-Hadley Enterprises
Donald M. Grant first met Thomas G. Hadley at Dana's Old Corner Bookstore in Providence, Rhode Island in 1945.  The bookstore had recently acquired the library of fellow Providence native, H. P. Lovecraft, from his estate.  Grant and Hadley wanted to see if there was anything of interest.  In the course of the chance meeting, they struck up a conversation about Lovecraft and decided that there should be a volume of memoirs by Providence natives who had known Lovecraft.  They ended up publishing Rhode Island on Lovecraft which was successful enough to warrant a second edition.

Works published by Grant-Hadley Enterprises
 Rhode Island on Lovecraft, edited by Donald M. Grant and Thomas G. Hadley (1945) (Two printings).

The Buffalo Book Company
Kenneth J. Krueger, a science fiction fan and book seller from Buffalo, New York, was drafted in 1945 and eventually stationed near Providence.  Krueger joined the venture bringing with him a mailing list from his book selling business.  At this point, Donald Grant had also entered the military and was stationed in Texas.  Krueger talked Tom Hadley into changing the name of the publisher to The Buffalo Book Company.  The first book published by The Buffalo Book Company was The Time Stream, by John Taine. According to Jack Chalker, the book did not sell well which delayed their second publication of The Skylark of Space by E. E. Smith. On the other hand, Robert Weinberg states that: "While neither book was particularly well put together or packaged, they sold well, especially the Smith title.

Works published by The Buffalo Book Company
 The Time Stream, by John Taine (1946)
 The Skylark of Space by E. E. Smith (1946). This title had originally been proposed as a book by William F. Crawford back in 1935.

The Hadley Publishing Co.
Lloyd Arthur Eshbach ordered a copy of Skylark of Space from The Buffalo Book Company, in 1945 or 1946.  Frustrated by the publishing delays, Eshbach wrote to the Buffalo Book Company offering suggestions as to how they could better market their books.  Thus started a correspondence between Eshbach and Tom Hadley with Eshbach continuing to offer advice.  At this point Ken Krueger had moved back to Buffalo and Don Grant was attending college, though he continued to offer recommendations on what to publish.  Hadley decided to continue the company on his own, renaming it The Hadley Publishing Co. According to Robert Weinberg, "making things even more complicated, Hadley and Grant later published a third edition of The Skylark of Space under the banner of FFF: Publishers. All of the Hadley volumes used ugly typefaces and were illustrated by barely competent fan artists. They reflected an enthusiasm for publishing but a lack of knowledge about the basics of the publishing business."

Works published by The Hadley Publishing Co.
 The Weapon Makers, by A. E. van Vogt (1946)
 The Mightiest Machine, by John W. Campbell, Jr. (1947)
 The Skylark of Space by E. E. Smith (1947), reset from The Buffalo Book Company edition
 Final Blackout, by L. Ron Hubbard (1948)

Notes

American speculative fiction publishers
Book publishing companies of the United States
Publishing companies established in 1945
Science fiction publishers
Small press publishing companies
1946 establishments in the United States